Say It may refer to:

Albums
 Say It (Born Ruffians album), 2010
 Say It (Britt Nicole album), 2007
 Say It (EP), by Ju-Taun, 2006

Songs
 "Say It" (ABC song), 1992
 "Say It" (Booty Luv song), 2009
 "Say It" (Flume song), featuring Tove Lo, 2016
 "Say It" (Kids in the Kitchen song), 1987
 "Say It" (Tory Lanez song), 2015
 "Say It" (Voices of Theory song), 1998
 "Say It", a song by Blue October from the 2009 album Approaching Normal
 "Say It", a 2021 song by Choomba featuring LP Giobbi and Blush'ko
 "Say It", a song by Enrique Iglesias from the 2003 album 7
 "Say It", a song by Ne-Yo from the 2007 album Because of You
 "Say It", a song by Rihanna from the 2007 album Good Girl Gone Bad
 "Say It", a song by the Beastie Boys from the 2011 album Hot Sauce Committee Part Two
 "Say It", a song by T-Pain from the 2005 album Rappa Ternt Sanga

See also
 
 
 Say It Again (disambiguation)